The Falcon and the Snowman is a 1985 American spy drama film directed by John Schlesinger. The screenplay by Steven Zaillian is based on the 1979 book The Falcon and the Snowman: A True Story of Friendship and Espionage by Robert Lindsey, and tells the true story of two young American men, Christopher Boyce (Timothy Hutton) and Andrew Daulton Lee (Sean Penn), who sold US security secrets to the Soviet Union. The film features the song "This Is Not America," written and performed by David Bowie and the Pat Metheny Group.

Plot
Christopher Boyce, an expert in the sport of falconry and the son of a former FBI special agent, gets a job at a civilian defense contractor working in the so-called "Black Vault," a secure communication facility through which flows information on some of the most classified U.S. operations in the world. Boyce becomes disillusioned with the U.S. government through his new position, especially after reading a misrouted communiqué dealing with the CIA's plan to depose the Prime Minister of Australia. Frustrated by this duplicity, Boyce decides to repay his government by passing classified secrets to the Soviets.

Andrew Daulton Lee is a drug addict and minor cocaine smuggler, nicknamed "The Snowman," who has frustrated and alienated his family. Lee agrees to contact and deal with the KGB's agents in Mexico on Boyce's behalf, motivated not by idealism but by what he perceives as an opportunity to make money with plans to settle in Costa Rica, a nation that at that time had no extradition treaty with the United States.

As the pair become increasingly involved with espionage, Lee's ambition to create a major espionage business coupled with his excessive drug use begins to strain the two from each other. Alex, their Soviet handler, becomes increasingly reluctant to deal through Lee as the middleman because of Lee's periods of irrationality. Above all, Boyce wants to end the espionage act so that he can resume a normal life with his girlfriend Lana and attend college. Boyce meets with Lee's KGB handler to explain the situation. Meanwhile, Lee is desperate to regain the Soviets' regard after realizing that the KGB no longer needs him as a courier. Lee is observed tossing a note over the fence at the Soviet embassy in Mexico City and is arrested by Mexican police and a U.S. Foreign Service officer accompanies him to the police station.

When the police search his pockets and find film from a Minox camera Boyce used to photograph documents along with a postcard used by the Soviets to show Lee the location of a drop zone, they produce pictures of the same location that was on the postcard, showing officers surrounding a dead man on the street. The Foreign Service officer explains that the Mexican police are trying to implicate him with the murder of a policeman. The police then drag Lee away and interrogate him.

Hours later, Lee reveals that he is a Soviet spy. Told by the Mexican police that he will be deported, Lee is offered a choice of where to be sent. Lee suggests Costa Rica, but the choice is merely between the Soviet Union and the United States. Lee reluctantly agrees to go back to America and is arrested as he walks across the border.

Knowing that he too will soon be captured, Boyce releases his pet falcon, Fawkes, and then sits down to wait. Moments later, U.S. Marshals and FBI agents surround and capture him. As the film ends, Lee and Boyce are seen being escorted to prison.

Cast

Critical reception
The Falcon and The Snowman received generally positive notices upon release in 1985 and currently has an 82% on Rotten Tomatoes from 22 critics.

Film critic Roger Ebert gave it a perfect four-star rating, citing one of the many strengths as that "it succeeds, in an admirably matter-of-fact way, in showing us exactly how these two young men got in way over their heads. This is a movie about spies, but it is not a thriller in any routine sense of the word. It's just the meticulously observant record of how naiveté, inexperience, misplaced idealism and greed led to one of the most peculiar cases of treason in American history."

Film critic Gene Siskel of the Chicago Tribune also gave the film four stars and hailed Hutton and Penn's work in the film, writing that "it's tough to spot Penn in this new role" and calling Penn's performance rare because it "neither patronizes nor celebrates drug use; instead, it's absolutely lifelike, and for a film based on a true story, there is no greater compliment."  Siskel also noted that the two lead characters formed an odd couple that made "a terrific formula for a movie, creating at least three stories: The plight of each man, their joint effort to accomplish their goal and the changing dynamic of their relationship as the story progresses.  As if that weren't enough, 'The Falcon and the Snowman' also turns into a 'how-to' movie with a fine sense of detail for the worlds of espionage and drugs."

Captain Midnight intrusion

On April 27, 1986, a broadcast of The Falcon and The Snowman by HBO was interrupted for four and a half minutes by a pirate broadcast featuring a message protesting the network's introduction of signal scrambling and higher charges for satellite dish owners. The incident made national headlines; the hijacker, electrical engineer John R. MacDougall, was eventually arrested and fined $5,000.

Music

References

External links
 
 
 
 
 Lucy, the Peregrine Falcon used in the movie.
 Movie stills

1980s spy drama films
1985 crime drama films
1985 films
American crime drama films
American spy drama films
Cold War spy films
American docudrama films
Fictional duos
Films directed by John Schlesinger
Films set in Mexico
Films set in Mexico City
Films set in the 1970s
Films with screenplays by Steven Zaillian
Orion Pictures films
Spy films based on actual events
1980s English-language films
1980s American films